System G is a cluster supercomputer at Virginia Tech consisting of 324 Apple Mac Pro computers with a total of 2592 processing cores. It was finished in November 2008 and ranked 279 in that month's edition of TOP500, running at 16.78 teraflops and peaking at 22.94 teraflops. It now runs at a "sustained (Linpack) performance of 22.8 TFlops".   It transmits data between nodes over Gigabit Ethernet and 40Gbit/s Infiniband.

Mac Pro Nodes
Each of the 324 Mac Pro machines contains two quad-core 2.8 GHz Xeon processors and 8 gigabytes of RAM.

Namesake
System G's name stems from its homage to System X and to its focus on green computing—the cluster has thousands of power and thermal sensors to test high performance computing at low power requirements and is the largest power-aware research system in the world.

References

External links
 Computer Science at Virginia Tech: System G
 Virginia Tech: Center for High-End Computing Systems (‘CHECS’)
 Ars Technica: Virginia Tech building super computer out of 324 Mac Pros
 TOP500 website

X86 supercomputers
Virginia Tech